Richard Ettinghausen (February 5, 1906 – April 2, 1979) Princeton, New Jersey was a German-American historian of Islamic art and chief curator of the Freer Gallery.

Education
Ettinghausen was born in  Frankfurt am Main, Germany. He received his Ph.D. from the University of Frankfurt in 1931 in Islamic history and art history.

Career
From 1929 to 1931, he worked on the Islamic collection of the Kaiser Friedrich Museum in Berlin under the direction of Ernst Kühnel and the collector/archaeologist Friedrich Sarre.

In 1934, due to the rise of the Nazis, he immigrated first to Great Britain and then to the United States, where he joined the staff of Arthur Upham Pope at the Institute of Persian Art and Archaeology in New York. From 1937 to 1938, he taught his first class at the Institute of Fine Art, New York University. In 1938 he was appointed an associate professor at the University of Michigan.

In 1944, Ettinghausen left Michigan to join the Freer Gallery. The following year he married the art historian Elisabeth Sgalitzer. He also lectured at Princeton University. In 1961 he was appointed chief curator of the Freer. During his tenure at the Freer, he built the collection into one of the finest collections on Islamic art in the world. He wrote a book "Arab Painting: Treasures of Asia, Vol IV" published by Editions d'Art Albert Skira, Geneva in 1962.

In 1966, Ettinghausen left the Freer to become Hagop Kevorkian Professor of Islamic Art at the Institute of Fine Art, New York University.  Together with the Middle East historian R. Bayly Winder he founded the Kevorkian Center the same year at NYU.

Three years later, he also became the Consultative Chairman of the Islamic Department of the Metropolitan Museum of Art. At the Metropolitan, he was instrumental in installing the galleries to their sensitive arrangement.  His text, with Oleg Grabar, The Art and Architecture of Islam 650-1250 in the Pelican History of Art series, appeared posthumously in 1987.

Ettinghausen was elected to the American Academy of Arts and Sciences in 1974 and the American Philosophical Society in 1976.

Both a Jew and an avid Islamicist, his ties to Israel found expression in his promotion of the establishment of a museum for Islamic art in Jerusalem.

Ettinghausen died of cancer in Mercer, New Jersey.  The library in the Kevorkian Center is named in his honor.

Posthumous
After his death, Sultan bin Muhammad Al-Qasimi acquired Ettinghausen's private library. These works were then donated to the newly built House of Wisdom in Sharjah.

See also
 Islamic art
 Madiha Omar

References

External links
Dictionary of Art Historians
Richard Ettinghausen entry in Encyclopaedia Iranica

Bibliography
Kleinbauer, W. Eugene. Modern Perspectives in Western Art History: An Anthology of 20th-Century Writings on the Visual Arts. New York: Holt, Rinehart and Winston, 1971, p. 89
Porada, Edith.  "Richard Ettinghausen." Yearbook of the American Philosophical Society 1979 pp. 58–61
Cook, Joan. "Richard Ettinghausen, Teacher, A Leading Islamic Art Authority, Planned Turkish Exhibition, Taught at Princeton." New York Times April 3, 1979, p. C18

German art historians
Historians of Islamic art
Corresponding Fellows of the British Academy
Jewish historians
1906 births
1979 deaths
Jewish emigrants from Nazi Germany to the United States
University of Michigan faculty
20th-century German historians
German male non-fiction writers
Recipients of the Pour le Mérite (civil class)
Members of the American Philosophical Society